Dr. Marjorie Hass is an American academic who serves as the President of the Council of Independent Colleges. She served as the 20th president of Rhodes College in Memphis, TN from July 2017 to June 2021. She also served as president of Austin College in Sherman, TX from July 2009 to June 2017. Earlier at Muhlenberg College in Allentown, PA, she headed the Center for Ethics.

References

Year of birth missing (living people)
Living people
University of Illinois Urbana-Champaign alumni
Heads of universities and colleges in the United States
Rhodes College